Johannes von Muralt is the name of:
 Johannes von Muralt (physician) (1645–1733), Swiss anatomist and surgeon
 Johannes von Muralt (lawyer) (1877–1947), Swiss lawyer and President of the Swiss Red Cross
  (1780–1850), Swiss churchman and pedagogue active in Saint-Petersburg since 1810